Pleasant Hills is a no longer inhabited, former community in the Canadian province of Nova Scotia, located in  Colchester County.

South of Pleasant Hills are the communities of Upper Economy and Little Bass River.

References
Pleasant Hills on Destination Nova Scotia 

Communities in Colchester County
General Service Areas in Nova Scotia